Secrets of Sulphur Springs is an American time-travel mystery thriller drama television series which premiered on Disney Channel on January 15, 2021. Created by writer Tracey Thomson who also serves as a co-executive producer with Charles Pratt Jr. and set in the fictional Louisiana town of Sulphur Springs, the series was renewed for a third season on February 7, 2022 and is set to air on March 24, 2023.

Plot
12-year-old Griffin Campbell and his family move into the closed down and dilapidated Tremont Hotel in Sulphur Springs, Louisiana, that his father bought without much explanation. The hotel is supposedly haunted by Savannah Dillon, a camper at the Tremont Camp who disappeared thirty years ago. With his new best friend Harper from his new school, Griffin discovers a portal which takes the two back in time 30 years to 1990, which they use to meet and find out what happened to Savannah Dillon. They try to save Savannah from disappearing.

Season 2 focuses on Harper as she tries to uncover the secrets behind her connections to the Tremont hotel after discovering a photo of her great-grandmother Daisy which leads her to believe that the answers lie in the 1930s. Meanwhile, paranormal activities increase as the Campbells prepare to reopen the hotel, and Savannah tries to help Griffin and Harper uncover the secrets of the hotel from the past.

Cast and characters

Main
 Preston Oliver as Griffin Campbell, the protagonist. A young boy whose family moves from Chicago into the Tremont Hotel which is supposedly haunted by Savannah Dillon.
 Kyliegh Curran as Harper Marie Dunn, Griffin's new best friend who is excited to learn if the rumors about Savannah are true and help Griffin find out.
Curran also portrays Harper's great-grandmother Daisy Tremont as a young girl.
 Elle Graham as Savannah Dillon, the girl who mysteriously disappeared thirty years prior to the series' start.
 Madeleine McGraw as Zoey Campbell, Griffin's younger sister and Wyatt's twin.
 Landon Gordon as Wyatt Campbell, Griffin's younger brother and Zoey's twin.
 Kelly Frye as Sarah Campbell, Griffin's mother who knows how difficult their move is on the family.
 Josh Braaten as Bennett "Ben" Campbell Jr., Griffin's father who is hiding a secret from his family. 
Jake Melrose portrays him as a young boy in season 1.
 Diandra Lyle as Jessica "Jess" Dunn, (season 2; recurring season 1), Harper's mother.
 Izabela Rose plays her as a young girl in season 1.

Recurring
 Bryant Tardy (season 1) and Johari Washington (season 2) as Topher Dunn, Harper's younger brother.
 Jim Gleason as Bennett Campbell Sr., Griffin, Zoey, and Wyatt's grandfather.
 Trina LaFargue as Becky, counselor of camp Tremont.
 Sherri Marina as Mrs. Douglas (season 1), teacher at Sulphur Springs Middle School. This is one of Marina's final acting roles prior to her death.
Jillian Batherson as Caroline, Savannah's adoptive mother from 1962.
Ethan Hutchison as Sam Tremont (season 2), Daisy's younger brother.
Eugene Byrd portrays Sam as an adult in 1962.
Robert Manning Jr. as Elijah Tremont (season 2), Daisy's father.

Episodes

Series overview
</onlyinclude>

Season 1 (2021)

Season 2 (2022)

Season 3

Production
Originally titled Sulphur Springs, the project was developed as a pilot for Disney Channel; it was later pitched to Disney+, where it received a cast-contingent series order. The series entered pre-production, but the casting process was unsuccessful and Disney+ passed on the series. By May 2019, development for the series had moved from the streaming service back to Disney Channel, and casting continued for the series, now being produced as a pilot; two roles had been filled by this point. Originally developed as an hour-long series, the program was later shortened to a half-hour format. In October 2019, the series was officially ordered by the network for an eleven-episode season.

Production was scheduled to begin in New Orleans in 2020. Filming commenced in Louisiana towards the end of 2019 and paused on February 23, 2020, due to the COVID-19 pandemic in Louisiana. Filming for the season was completed between October 5 and November 6, 2020. On April 23, 2021, the series was renewed for a second season, which premiered on January 14, 2022. On February 7, 2022, the series was renewed for a third season, which will premiere on March 24, 2023.

Broadcast
In the United States, the series premiered with three episodes combined into a one-hour special, airing on Disney Channel on January 15, 2021. Episodes continued to air weekly on the network, each Friday until March 12, 2021.

In a first for a Disney Channel series, the program received a "high-profile" release schedule on Disney+. The first five episodes were made available on the streaming service on February 26, 2021. Episodes continued to be added each Friday until April 9, 2021. Nellie Andreeva of Deadline speculated that a successful run on Disney+ could lead to the series being moved to the streaming service as an original series for a potential second season.

Reception

Ratings
 

| link2             = #Season 2 (2022)
| episodes2         = 8
| start2            = 
| end2              = 
| startrating2      = 0.64
| endrating2        = 0.19
| viewers2          = |2}} 
}}

Awards and nominations

Notes

References

External links
 
 

2020s American teen drama television series
2020s American mystery television series
2020s American time travel television series
2021 American television series debuts
Disney Channel original programming
English-language television shows
Television series about siblings
Television series about teenagers
Television productions suspended due to the COVID-19 pandemic
Television shows filmed in Louisiana
Television shows set in Chicago
Television shows set in Louisiana